Ezra Carll Homestead is a historic home located in South Huntington, New York in Suffolk County, New York. It is located on the northwest corner of Melville Road and Eckert Street and was built about 1700 and is a 2-story, gable-roofed, wood-shingle dwelling with a lean-to profile and second-story overhang. The oldest part of the structure is the -story, gable-roofed south wing.  It has a rubblestone foundation and massive central chimney.

It was added to the National Register of Historic Places in 1985.

References

Houses on the National Register of Historic Places in New York (state)
Houses in Suffolk County, New York
National Register of Historic Places in Suffolk County, New York